Katharine Alexander (sometimes Katherine; September 22, 1898 - January 10, 1981) was an American actress on stage and screen. She appeared in 44 films between 1930 and 1951.

Biography
Alexander was born in Fort Smith, Arkansas, the daughter of Joseph Hall "Josiah" Alexander and Susan Sophronia Duncan. She was an enrolled citizen of the Cherokee Nation, listed as 1/16th Cherokee on the Dawes Rolls. As a young woman, she planned to be a concert artist, but Samuel Goldwyn saw her giving a violin recital and gave her a chance on stage. She became one of Broadway's leading ladies but went into films in 1930.

Theatrical productions

Alexander debuted on stage in A Successful Calamity with William Gillette. She starred alongside Paul Muni as his wife Linda Loman in London's Phoenix Theatre production of Death of a Salesman, which opened on July 28, 1949, directed by Elia Kazan. 

Her Broadway credits included Time for Elizabeth (1948), Little Brown Jug (1946), Letters to Lucerne (1941), The Party's Over (1933), Honeymoon (1932), Best Years (1932), The Left Bank (1931), Stepdaughters of War (1930), Hotel Universe (1930), The Boundary Line (1930), Little Accident (1929), The Queen's Husband (1928), Hangman's House (1926), Gentle Grafters (1926), The Call of Life (1925), Arms and the Man (1925), It All Depends (1925), Ostriches (1925), The Stork (1925), That Awful Mrs. Eaton (1924), Leah Kleschna (1924), Chains (1923), Love Laughs (1919), Good Morning, Judge (1919), and A Successful Calamity (1917).

Personal life
On January 5, 1926, Alexander married producer William A. Brady Jr. in New York City. Brady was the son of William A. Brady a theatre actor, producer, and sports promoter; and the actress Grace George.  They had a daughter, Barbara Alexander Brady, who became an actress.

Death
Alexander died in Tryon, North Carolina on January 10, 1981, aged 82. She was buried in the Fairmount addition to Forest Park Cemetery in her native Fort Smith.

Partial filmography

Should Ladies Behave (1933) - Mrs. Winifred Lamont
Death Takes a Holiday (1934) - Alda
The Barretts of Wimpole Street (1934) - Arabel Barrett
Operator 13 (1934) - Pauline
The Painted Veil (1934) - Mrs. Townsend
Enchanted April (1935) - Mrs. Rose Arbuthnot
After Office Hours (1935) - Julia Patterson
Cardinal Richelieu (1935) - Queen Anne
Alias Mary Dow (1935) - Evelyn Dow
The Girl from 10th Avenue (1935) - Valentine French Marland
Ginger (1935) - Mrs. Elizabeth Parker
She Married Her Boss (1935) - Gertrude Barclay
Splendor (1935) - Martha Lorrimore
Sutter's Gold (1936) - Anna Sutter
Moonlight Murder (1936) - Louisa Chiltern
The Devil Is a Sissy (1936) - Hilda Pierce
Reunion (1936) - Mrs. Crandall
As Good as Married (1937) - Alma Burnside
The Girl from Scotland Yard (1937) - Lady Helen Lavering
That Certain Woman (1937) - Mrs. Rogers
Stage Door (1937) - Cast of Stage Play
Double Wedding (1937) - Claire Lodge
Rascals (1938) - Mrs. Agatha Adams
The Great Man Votes (1939) - Miss Billow
Broadway Serenade (1939) - Harriet Ingalls
In Name Only (1939) - Laura
Three Sons (1939) - Abigail Pardway
The Hunchback of Notre Dame (1939) - Madame de Lys
Anne of Windy Poplars (1940) - Ernestine Pringle
Dance, Girl, Dance (1940) - Miss Olmstead
Play Girl (1941) - Mrs. Dice
Sis Hopkins (1941) - Clara Hopkins
Angels with Broken Wings (1941) - Charlotte Lord
The Vanishing Virginian (1942) - Marcia Marshall
On the Sunny Side (1942) - Mrs. Mary Andrews
Small Town Deb (1942) - Mrs. Randall
Now, Voyager (1942) - Miss Trask
The Human Comedy (1943) - Mrs. Steed
Kiss and Tell (1945) - Janet Archer
For the Love of Mary (1948) - Miss Harkness
John Loves Mary (1949) - Phyllis McKinley

References

External links

American film actresses
20th-century American actresses
Cherokee Nation people (1794–1907)
Cherokee Nation people
Actresses from Arkansas
Native American actresses
People from Fort Smith, Arkansas
1898 births
1981 deaths